Sung Jong-hyun (born April 2, 1979) is a South Korean retired football player. He formerly played for Jeonbuk Hyundai Motors, Gwangju Sangmu Bulsajo, Shenyang Dongjin and Goyang KB Kookmin Bank FC.

Sung transferred to Shenyang Dongjin in January 2011.

References

1979 births
Living people
South Korean footballers
South Korean expatriate footballers
Jeonbuk Hyundai Motors players
Gimcheon Sangmu FC players
Shenyang Dongjin players
Goyang KB Kookmin Bank FC players
China League One players
K League 1 players
Korea National League players
Expatriate footballers in China
South Korean expatriate sportspeople in China
Association football defenders